Norbert Bolz (born 17 April 1953) is a German media theorist. He served as a professor at the Technical University of Berlin until his retirement in 2018.

Bolz developed a media theory, the "", that is influenced by Friedrich Nietzsche, Walter Benjamin and Marshall McLuhan.

Film and TV appearances 

 Marx Reloaded, Arte, April 2011.
 Unter den Linden, Phoenix, June 2021.

External links
Profile at the TU Berlin

1953 births
Living people
German philosophers
Academic staff of the Technical University of Berlin
German male writers
Mass media theorists
Philosophers of technology